Kettleburgh is a small village and civil parish in the East Suffolk district, in the county of Suffolk. The population of this Civil Parish at the 2011 Census was 231.

It is near the small towns of Wickham Market and Framlingham in the valley of the River Deben.

The grade I listed church of St Andrew dates from the 14th century and was restored in 1890.  The village also has a pub.

Notable residents
Corrie Grant (1850-1924), journalist, barrister and Liberal Party politician who served as the Member of Parliament (MP) for the Rugby division of Warwickshire from 1900 to 1910.

References 

Villages in Suffolk
Civil parishes in Suffolk